In some operating systems, vol is a command within the command-line interpreters (shells) such as COMMAND.COM and cmd.exe. It is used to display the volume label and volume serial number of a logical drive, such as a hard disk partition or a floppy disk, if they exist.

Implementations

The command is available in various versions of DOS, DR FlexOS, IBM/Toshiba 4690 OS, IBM OS/2, Microsoft Windows, and ReactOS.

On MS-DOS, the command is available in versions 2 and later. Paragon Technology Systems PTS-DOS 2000 Pro also includes a  implementation.

The Windows dir command also displays the volume label and serial number (if it has one) as part of the directory listing.

The command is also available in the EFI shell.

Syntax
 vol [Drive:]

Arguments:
Drive: This command-line argument specifies the drive letter of the disk for which to display the volume label and serial number.

Note:
On Windows, the volume serial number is displayed only for disks formatted with MS-DOS version 4.0 or later.
OS/2 allows the user to specify more than one drive. The vol command displays the volume labels consecutively.

Examples

IBM OS/2
[C:\]vol C:

The volume label in drive C is OS/2.
The Volume Serial Number is 0815:1611.

Microsoft Windows
C:\Users\root>vol C:
Volume in drive C is Windows
Volume Serial Number is 080F-100B
In the example above, if drive C: has no volume label, "has no label" is shown instead of "is Windows".

Supported file systems
FAT12
FAT16
FAT32
exFAT
NTFS

See also
Label (command) — Used to create, change and delete the disk volume label.
List of DOS commands

References

Further reading

External links

vol | Microsoft Docs

Internal DOS commands
MSX-DOS commands
OS/2 commands
ReactOS commands
Windows commands
Microcomputer software
Windows administration